Torkington in Greater Manchester, England, is part of the Metropolitan Borough of Stockport.

History
In 1875 Torkington was one of eight civil parishes of Cheshire to be included in the Stockport rural sanitary district. The sanitary district became the Stockport Rural District in 1894.

The parish was abolished in 1900 and its former area became part of the Hazel Grove and Bramhall civil parish and urban district. The district was abolished in 1974, under the Local Government Act 1972, and its former area was transferred to Greater Manchester to be combined with that of other districts to form the present-day Metropolitan Borough of Stockport.

See also
Tarkington

References

Areas of Greater Manchester
Geography of the Metropolitan Borough of Stockport